Trevor Ashmore Pyman (25 December 19162 April 1995) was an Australian diplomat.

Family
The son of Francis George Servante Pyman (1884–1964), and Blanche Ashmore Pyman (1888–1946), née Mitchell, Trevor Ashmore Pyman was born at Ripponlea, Victoria on 25 December 1916. He had two brothers, Clive Francis Henry Pyman (1913–1995), and James Brice Pyman (1923–1987).

Trevor Pyman married Margaret Haddon Hall on 1 August 1942; they had four children, three sons, and a daughter.

Education
Pyman was educated at Caulfield Grammar School, as were his two brothers. He was an excellent schoolboy footballer for CGS, and was dux of the school in 1934.

He attended the University of Melbourne, and attained the following qualifications:
 Bachelor of Arts (B.A.) — in 1938.
 Bachelor of Laws (LL.B.) — in 1940.
 Master of Laws (LL.M.) — in 1944.
 Diploma in Public Administration (Dip.Pub.Admin.) — in 1946.

Law
On 4 September 1945, in the Victorian State High Court, Pyman was admitted to practise as a barrister and solicitor.

Military
He served in the Second AIF from November 1941 to October 1944; and he remained "on strength" until he was retired (effective date 30 December 1971) at the end of 1971.

Diplomat
Pyman joined the Australian Diplomatic Service in 1944; having been discharged from the army to do so.

During his fourteen-year tenure in the diplomatic service he worked with Dr Evatt as part of the Australian Delegation to form the United Nations.

He later worked as Australia's Acting High Commissioner to Ottawa, Ontario, Canada, and as Head of Chancery and Counsellor at the Australian Embassy in Washington, D.C. While in Washington he also served as one of Australia's representatives to the United Nations General Assembly in New York City.

Retired
He was retired from the Public Service, on medical grounds, in December 1977.

Australian Outlook
Pyman's influential article, "The United Nations Secretary-Generalship: A Review of its Status, Functions and Role", written immediately after the (September 1961) death of the U.N. Secretary-General, Dag Hammarskjöld, in a plane crash in Northern Rhodesia, was published in Australian Outlook, now known as the Australian Journal of International Affairs, in December 1961.

See also
 List of Caulfield Grammar School people

Footnotes

References
 Pyman, T.A., "The United Nations Secretary-Generalship: A Review of its Status, Functions and Role, Australian Outlook, Vol.15, No.3, (December 1961), pp. 240–259. doi=10.1080/00049916108565402
 
 

1916 births
1995 deaths
People educated at Caulfield Grammar School
University of Melbourne alumni
Melbourne Law School alumni
High Commissioners of Australia to Canada
20th-century Australian politicians
Australian Army personnel of World War II
Australian Army officers